Thamsanqa Rapelego (born 25 December 1992) is a South African cricketer. He made his List A debut for Gauteng in the 2018–19 CSA Provincial One-Day Challenge on 10 February 2019. In April 2021, he was named in Limpopo's squad, ahead of the 2021–22 cricket season in South Africa.

References

External links
 

1992 births
Living people
South African cricketers
Gauteng cricketers
Place of birth missing (living people)